Marionia glama is a species of dendronotid nudibranch. It is a marine gastropod mollusc in the family Tritoniidae.

Distribution
This species is endemic to the Red Sea.

References

Tritoniidae
Gastropods described in 1831